High Pockets or Highpockets may refer to:

People
 George Kelly (baseball) (1895–1984), American major league baseball player
 Claire Phillips (1907–1960), American World War II Allied spy, author and entertainer
 Ted Trent (1903–1944), American Negro league baseball pitcher
 Tom Turner (first baseman) (1915–2013), American Negro league baseball player

Film
High Pockets, a 1919 silent Western film
  Sam "High Pockets" Huxley, protagonist of the 1955 war film Battle Cry, played by Van Heflin

Lists of people by nickname